Bethanchwok GP-Dhunkharka  is a village development committee in Kavrepalanchok District in Bagmati Province of central Nepal. At the time of the 1991 Nepal census it had a population of 4,372 and had 747 houses in it.

References

External links
UN map of the municipalities of Kavrepalanchok District

Populated places in Kavrepalanchok District